Erkki Kerttula (5 November 1909 – 4 November 1989) was a Finnish fencer. He competed at the 1948 and 1952 Summer Olympics.

References

External links
 

1909 births
1989 deaths
Finnish male foil fencers
Olympic fencers of Finland
Fencers at the 1948 Summer Olympics
Fencers at the 1952 Summer Olympics
Sportspeople from Oulu
Finnish male épée fencers
Finnish male sabre fencers